The Aero A.38 was a Czechoslovakian biplane airliner of the 1920s and 1930s. Following the relatively modern A.35, this aircraft was something of a throwback, marrying a fuselage derived from the A.35 to wings copied from the A.23. A few served with CSA, and others with French airline Compagnie Internationale de Navigation Aérienne. These latter aircraft were powered by a French Gnome-Rhône engine instead.

Variants
 A.38-1 : Fitted with a Walter-built Bristol Jupiter radial piston engine. Three built.
 A.38-2 : Fitted with a  Gnome-Rhône 9A2 Jupiter radial piston engine. Two built.

Specifications (A.38)

See also

References

A038
Biplanes
Single-engined tractor aircraft
1920s Czechoslovakian airliners